Albin Felc (born May 14, 1941) is a retired Slovenian professional ice hockey player.

Career

Club career
In 1958, Felc made his debut in the Yugoslav Ice Hockey League with HK Jesenice. He scored 458 goals in the Yugoslav League, which was the league record until in 1971. Felc also played for teams in Italy and Switzerland. He retired after playing with HK Celje in 1982.

International career
He represented the Yugoslavia national ice hockey team from 1961–1979, and scored 82 goals and 91 assists in 155 games. Felc participated with Yugoslavia at the Winter Olympics in 1964, 1968, and 1972.

Coaching career
In 1983, HK Jesenice named Felc their head coach.

References

1941 births
Living people
HK Acroni Jesenice players
Ice hockey players at the 1964 Winter Olympics
Ice hockey players at the 1968 Winter Olympics
Ice hockey players at the 1972 Winter Olympics
Olympic ice hockey players of Yugoslavia
Sportspeople from Jesenice, Jesenice
Slovenian ice hockey coaches
Slovenian ice hockey forwards
Yugoslav ice hockey forwards
Yugoslav expatriate ice hockey people
Asiago Hockey 1935 players
KHL Medveščak Zagreb players
Yugoslav expatriate sportspeople in Italy
Yugoslav expatriate sportspeople in Switzerland
EHC Arosa players
SHC Fassa players
Expatriate ice hockey players in Italy
Expatriate ice hockey players in Switzerland